Guy Marchand (born 22 May 1937) is a French actor, musician and singer.  He is best known for his role as the fictional private detective Nestor Burma.

Selected filmography

 1962: The Longest Day as an extra (Uncredited)
 1975: Cousin Cousine, directed by Jean-Charles Tacchella: Pascal
 1978: Holiday Hotel, directed by Michel Lang: Hubert Delambre
 1979: Le Maître-nageur, directed by Jean-Louis Trintignant: Marcel Potier
 1980: Loulou, directed by Maurice Pialat: André
 1981: Garde à Vue, directed by Claude Miller: Inspecteur Marcel Belmont
 1981: Coup de Torchon, directed by Bertrand Tavernier: Marcel Chavasson
 1982: Les Sous-doués en vacances, directed by Claude Zidi: Paul Memphis
 1983: Deadly Circuit, directed by Claude Miller: The pale man
 1983: Entre Nous, directed by Diane Kurys: Michel
 1983:  (TV miniseries), directed by Christian-Jaque: Ferdinand de Lesseps
 1984: P'tit Con, directed by Gérard Lauzier: Bob Choupon
 1985: Hold-Up, directed by Alexandre Arcady: Georges
 1986: Conseil de famille, directed by Costa-Gavras: Maximilien Faucon
 1987: L'été en pente douce, directed by Gérard Krawczyk: Andre Voke
 1987: , directed by Gilles Béhat: Charlie Dingo
 1987: , directed by Pierre Granier-Deferre: Inspecteur Leroyer
 1989: Try This One for Size, directed by Guy Hamilton: Ottavioni
 1989: Les Maris, les Femmes, les Amants, directed by Pascal Thomas: Bruno
 1990: My New Partner II, directed by Claude Zidi: Guy Brisson
 1991-2003:  (TV series): Nestor Burma
 1991: May Wine (TV movie), directed by Carol Wiseman: Dr. Paul Charmant
 1996: Beaumarchais, directed by Édouard Molinaro: Court Member
 1996: The Best Job in the World, directed by Gérard Lauzier: Gauthier
 2002: Ma femme s'appelle Maurice, directed by Jean-Marie Poiré: Charles Boisdain
 2006: Dans Paris, directed by Christophe Honoré: Mirko
 2006: Paid, directed by Laurence Lamers: Giuseppe
 2007: , directed by Gaël Morel: François
 2008: Passe-passe, directed by Tonie Marshall: Pierre Delage, the Minister
 2010: L'Arbre et la forêt, directed by Olivier Ducastel and Jacques Martineau: Frédérick
 2014: L'Art de la fugue, directed by Brice Cauvin: Francis
 2014: The Dune, directed by Yossi Aviram: Paolo
 2015: Paris-Willouby, directed by Arthur Delaire and Quentin Reynaud: Police officer 1
 2017: Just to Be Sure directed by Carine Tardieu: The father

References

External links 

1937 births
Living people
French male film actors
French male television actors
Male actors from Paris
Singers from Paris
20th-century French male actors
21st-century French male actors
Best Supporting Actor César Award winners
20th-century French male singers
21st-century French male singers